The Spirit of '67 may refer to:

The Spirit of '67 (Oliver Nelson and Pee Wee Russell album), 1967
The Spirit of '67 (Paul Revere & the Raiders album), 1966
Spirit of '67 (Vanilla Fudge album), 2015